James Leslie Armstrong (16 June 1887 – 4 December 1964) was an Australian rules footballer who played with Geelong in the Victorian Football League (VFL).

Football
Armstrong, a defender, came to Geelong from the Mercantile Football Club. He was used mostly in the back pocket and as a half back flanker. Durable, he put together 91 consecutive games from 1909 to 1913.

Military service
During World War II he served in the Volunteer Defence Corps, enlisting in Frankston in 1942.

Notes

References
 Holmesby, Russell & Main, Jim (2007), The Encyclopedia of AFL Footballers, BAS Publishing. 
 Footballer's Leg Broken, The Geelong Advertiser, (Saturday, 31 July 1915), p.3.
 Footballer Injured, The Geelong Advertiser, (Friday, 6 August 1915), p.3.

External links

 
 

1887 births
Australian rules footballers from Geelong
Geelong Football Club players
1964 deaths
Volunteer Defence Corps soldiers
Military personnel from Victoria (Australia)